145th Field Artillery Monument is a memorial in Salt Lake City's Memory Grove, in the U.S. state of Utah. Dedicated in 1927, the monument was erected by the 145th Field Artillery and has a gray granite shaft and circular bench. The bas-relief sculpture depicts horses and men. The memorial once featured a sundial.

References

External links

 

Outdoor sculptures in Salt Lake City